The Mercedes-Benz Arena is a multipurpose indoor arena in the Friedrichshain neighborhood of Berlin, Germany, which opened in 2008.

With a capacity of 17,000 people, it is home to the Eisbären Berlin ice hockey club and the Alba Berlin basketball team, and is used for other ice hockey, basketball and handball matches as well as concerts.

The arena hosted the 2008–09 Euroleague Final Four, European professional basketball club competition. The arena was one of the most prominent elements of the Mediaspree urban redevelopment project, quickly gaining emblematic status in the debates surrounding the project's impact. The arena hosted the 2022 Premier League Darts final on 13 June 2022.

Naming rights
In 2015, German car manufacturer Mercedes-Benz reached a deal with the arena management to rename the venue Mercedes-Benz Arena Berlin for twenty years. Between 2008 and 2015, the arena was known as O2 World Berlin due to sponsorship contract with Telefónica Germany, a telecommunications company.

Notable events
The first band to play at the Mercedes-Benz Arena was Metallica on 12 September 2008.
Tina Turner performed two sold-out concerts on 26 and 27 January 2009, with her Tina!: 50th Anniversary Tour.
The arena was also the home for the 2009 MTV Europe Music Awards.
Sting performed during his Symphonicities Tour on 21 September 2010, along with the Royal Philharmonic Orchestra. This show has been recorded for the live album Live in Berlin.
On 21 February 2009, Scorpions received Germany's ECHO Honorary Award for lifetime achievement at Berlin's O2 World.
The venue played host to one NHL Premiere game for the 2011–12 NHL season on 8 October 2011.  The Buffalo Sabres defeated the Los Angeles Kings, 4–2.
The arena hosted the second stage of the 2011 Euro Beach Soccer League between 8–10 July.
Britney Spears performed a sold-out concert on 26 July 2009 during The Circus Starring: Britney Spears. She returned for another sold-out show on 6 August 2018 as part of her Britney Spears: Piece of Me Tour.
Muse performed a sold-out concert on 29 October 2009 during The Resistance Tour
Kylie Minogue performed her Aphrodite: Les Folies Tour show on 1 March 2011.
Bob Dylan and Mark Knopfler played the O2 during the dual European tour on 29 October 2011.
Coldplay performed a sold-out show at the arena on 21 December 2011 as part of their Mylo Xyloto Tour.
On 27 March 2012, Il Divo performed a concert as part of their 2012 Wicked Game album tour.
Madonna performed during her MDNA Tour on two sold out nights in June 2012, and returned for two shows in November 2015 on her Rebel Heart Tour
Pearl Jam performed at the arena on 4 & 5 July 2012 during their 2012 tour
Laura Pausini performed here as part of her Inedito World Tour
The Beach Boys played during their 50th Anniversary Tour in August 2012.
Lady Gaga performed her Born This Way Ball in September 2012 for one sold out night, and on 9 October 2014 on her ArtRave: The Artpop Ball
Jennifer Lopez performed during her Dance Again World Tour in October 2012 for one night.
Beach soccer returned to the arena in August 2012 to again host the second stage of the 2012 Euro Beach Soccer League.
One Direction performed on 11 May 2013 on their Take Me Home Tour
Beyoncé performed to two sold-out crowds on 23 and 24 May 2013, with her Mrs. Carter Show.
Iron Maiden performed on 18 June 2013.
Rihanna performed on 2 July 2013, on her Diamonds World Tour.
On 7 February 2014 country-pop superstar Taylor Swift performed a show on her Red Tour.
On 22 May 2014 French-Armenian singer Charles Aznavour performed a show as part of his The Legend Returns Tour.
On 19 November 2014 rock band Linkin Park performed a show as a part of their The Hunting Party Tour.
Depeche Mode performed at the stadium three times: the first one was on 9 January 2010 during their Tour of the Universe. The second and the third were on 25 and 27 November 2013 during their Delta Machine Tour, in front of a total sold-out crowd of 28,332 people. The 2013 shows were filmed and recorded for the group's concert film Depeche Mode Live in Berlin and for the band's live album Live in Berlin Soundtrack.
U2 performed at the arena on 24, 25, 28 and 29 September 2015 as part of their Innocence + Experience Tour. They also played at the arena on 31 August and 1 September 2018 as part of their Experience + Innocence Tour.
Irish-American dancer and musician Michael Flatley reprised his role as Lord of the Dance on 6 December 2010 during the Return of Michael Flatley As Lord of the Dance tour. A few scenes from the 3D concert film Lord of the Dance 3D, were filmed in the during the performance in the arena alongside the O2 London and O2 Dublin. The film was released on DVD and Blu-ray under the title Michael Flatley Returns As Lord of the Dance in 2011. A 3D version was released only in Blu-ray in late 2011.
In October 2013, the artist Jakob Kupfer transformed the LED facade of the o2 World Berlin into a giant art installation.
On 31 May 2014 UFC Fight Night: Munoz vs. Mousasi was the first event that the UFC had hosted in the venue.
It hosted group matches of the FIBA EuroBasket 2015.
On 31 October 2015 it hosted the 2015 League of Legends World Championship final.
On 20 June 2015 held UFC Fight Night: Jędrzejczyk vs. Penne.
Adele performed on 7 and 8 May 2016 as part of her Adele Live 2016 tour.
Celine Dion performed on 23 and 24 July 2017 as part of her European summer tour, Celine Dion Live 2017
On 30 September 2017, G-Dragon performed during his Act III: M.O.T.T.E World Tour.
On 22 February 2018, it hosted the 4th week of the 2018 Premier League Darts from the Professional Darts Corporation, the first time the event took place in Germany.
On 16 October 2018, BTS performed during their second world tour BTS World Tour: Love Yourself. It was their first time in Europe.
On 28 February 2019, Nicki Minaj performed as a part of her European tour, The Nicki Wrld Tour.
On 14 May 2019, Hugh Jackman performed during his The Man. The Music. The Show. Tour.
On 17 May 2019, World Wrestling Entertainment hosted a house show.
On 11 July 2019, Christina Aguilera performed during her The X Tour.
On 13 July 2019, Monsta X performed during their We Are Here World Tour.
On 5–8 September 2019, the Champions stage of the StarLadder & i-League Berlin Major 2019 was hosted by StarLadder and Valve. This was an official Major tournament where teams from all over the world competed for $1,000,000 prize fund, playing the video game Counter-Strike: Global Offensive.
On 26 September 2019, singer-actress Cher started the European leg of her Here We Go Again Tour, her first tour to reach Europe since her Living Proof: The Farewell Tour in 2004.
On 13 October 2019, GOT7 performed here during their 2019 World Tour KEEP SPINNING.
On 7 and 8 March 2022 Genesis performed there to mark the start of the Europe leg of their The Last Domino? Tour.
On 10 May 2022, Dua Lipa performed a sold out show as part of her Future Nostalgia Tour.
On 29 June 2022 Céline Dion performed there during her Courage World Tour.
On 20 July 2022, Harry Styles performed there as a part of his Love on Tour.
It will host the final phase matches at the FIBA EuroBasket 2022.
On 13 June 2022 the arena hosted the 2022 Premier League Darts final.
On 19-20 December 2022, Blackpink will perform at the arena during their Born Pink World Tour.
On 14 February 2023, ATEEZ will perform at the arena during their THE FELLOWSHIP: BREAK THE WALL World Tour
On 20-21 February 2023, Robbie Williams will perform at the arena as part of the European leg of his XXV Tour.
On 21 March 2024, Céline Dion will perform at the arena during her Courage World Tour.

Attendance
This is a list of home attendance figures of Alba Berlin at O2 World.

Gallery

See also
List of indoor arenas in Germany
List of European ice hockey arenas

References

External links

Official site Mercedes-Benz Arena
Pictures of the Mercedes-Benz Arena Berlin
wikimapia

Sports venues completed in 2008
Indoor arenas in Germany
Indoor ice hockey venues in Germany
Basketball venues in Germany
Sports venues in Berlin
Handball venues in Germany
Esports venues in Germany